Ezra Child Carleton (September 6, 1838 – July 24, 1911) was a U.S. Representative from the 7th district of Michigan.

Carleton was born in St. Clair, Michigan, where he attended the common schools and graduated from the Port Huron High School in 1859.  He engaged in business as a hardware merchant in Port Huron and served as mayor of Port Huron in 1881 and 1882.

Carleton was elected as a Democrat to the 48th and 49th Congresses, serving from March 4, 1883, until March 3, 1887, in the U.S. House  representing Michigan's 7th congressional district. He was succeeded in office by Democrat Justin Rice Whiting.

After leaving Congress in 1887, Carleton returned to his former mercantile pursuits in Port Huron. He was the Democratic candidate for the 7th District in the election of 1894, losing to Republican Horace G. Snover.

Carleton died in Port Huron and is interred there in Lakeside Cemetery.

External links

Political Graveyard

1838 births
1911 deaths
Burials in Michigan
Hardware merchants
Democratic Party members of the United States House of Representatives from Michigan
Mayors of places in Michigan
People from Port Huron, Michigan
People from St. Clair, Michigan
19th-century American politicians